The Styal line is a suburban commuter railway line which runs through south Manchester, England; it commences at Slade Lane Junction,  south of , and ends  south at .

A branch line to Manchester Airport was built in 1993, accessed via a triangular junction between Heald Green and Styal;  it is also referred to as the Airport line.

Journeys into Manchester on the line have risen sharply since the 1990s and the opening of Manchester Airport railway station in 1993 fuelled an increase in express services from Northern England and beyond. As a result, it is now one of the most congested lines on the National Rail network, with services frequently susceptible to delays and cancellations. 

Between May 2018 and December 2022, the line operated on a skip-stop basis, with each station having a dedicated express service to Liverpool Lime Street, Preston, Blackpool North and Windermere. The three busiest stations,  and  retain a third hourly express service in addition to the stopping services.

History 

In the early twentieth century, the line between Manchester London Road (now called Piccadilly station) and Stockport became unable to cope with the increasing traffic. To solve the problem, a new route avoiding Stockport was constructed by the London and North Western Railway. It ran from Slade Lane Junction, located in Longsight, to Wilmslow through what was then mainly a rural area. The primary purpose was to provide a bypass for express trains, but a few wooden stations were built on the line to encourage suburban development. In practice, very few expresses latterly used the line, as it was necessary for most trains to serve the important station at Stockport. The line opened in 1909 and, from 1923, was operated by the London Midland and Scottish Railway.

In the 1950s, as part of British Rail's Modernisation Plan, the British Transport Commission identified the Styal line as a suitable test track to prove its new electrification scheme; the line was electrified in 1959. Some of the stations were rebuilt using the Mod-X system at this time. Following the Styal line tests, it was decided to adopt the 25 kV system across the electrified Great Britain rail network, outside the Southern Region. There was half-hourly electric service (Monday - Saturday) between Manchester Oxford Road and Alderley Edge operated by Class 304 EMUs. Services were extended to  when the MSJAR was re-electrified at 25 kV AC in 1971 and operated in this way until the line between Altrincham and Manchester was transferred to Manchester Metrolink in 1990.

In the 1970s, the Styal line was included in a proposal to create an underground railway across Manchester City Centre. The Picc-Vic scheme was abandoned in 1977, due to funding difficulties.

Initially, services ran via Heald Green only, until a triangular junction was added a few years later which provided a link towards Styal. Many services were then diesel powered until 2014. The introduction of Class 350s, by First TransPennine Express on the Edinburgh-Manchester Airport line, in December 2013 and Class 319s by Northern Rail in early 2015 curtailed the use of diesel trains on the line; this allowed for a 100 mph service compared with 75 mph limit for many diesel trains, such as the Class 156 and the now-retired Class 142 Pacer trains.

In 2006, the platforms at Mauldeth Road, Burnage, East Didsbury and Gatley stations were all reconstructed, as well as access improvements at Heald Green. Patronage on the line increased after this investment. At the time, most platforms were future-proofed and extended to allow six carriage operation; however, it was not until 2019, with the arrival of the Class 195 and Class 331 units, that this platform capacity was fully utilised on Northern routes to Liverpool (Mauldeth Road) and Blackpool North (Burnage, East Didsbury and Gatley) which operate with six coaches.

In recent years, usage of the line has surged with growing commuter patronage, along with non-stopping services which use the line between Manchester Piccadilly and Manchester Airport. Nowadays, most services on the line operate via the airport. There are a couple of services each day (mainly long-distance trains) which take the direct route from Styal to Heald Green; that is to say, from Heald Green South Junction to Heald Green North Junction, for traincrew route knowledge retention purposes northbound. However, the only services on the junction southbound are either freight or a Transport for Wales service which doesn't stop at either station and only operates on Sundays. This route can also be used for diversions if the Stockport route is closed for engineering work or is blocked due to an operational incident.

Stations

Services

Stopping services 
Early morning, late evening and peak services sometimes make additional stops to provide additional services. For example, Gatley is served by a Blackpool North bound train at 07:43 on Sunday mornings.

Express services 
These were operated by Class 185 DMUs until December 2013, when they were replaced with electric Class 350 EMUs. which were transferred to London Northwestern Railway in 2020, following replacement by Class 397 EMUs.

See also
Airport Line (Manchester Metrolink); Metrolink tram line also serving Manchester Airport.

References

External links

Greater Manchester Strategic Rail Study Final Report June 2001

Rail transport in Greater Manchester
Rail transport in Cheshire
Railway lines opened in 1909
Railway lines in North West England
Airport rail links in the United Kingdom